Manhattan Laundry is a complex of historic buildings located in the Shaw neighborhood of Washington, D.C.  It was listed on the National Register of Historic Places in 1994.

History
The complex originally housed the traction facility for a streetcar company. The oldest building on the site, the west building at 1346 Florida Ave, was built in 1877. The complex became a printing plant in 1892 and it was converted into a laundry in 1905.  It is part of the expansion of Washington's urban core and industrial development along Florida Avenue.

See also 
 Yale Steam Laundry: Another historic laundry in Washington, D.C.

References

1877 establishments in Washington, D.C.
Art Deco architecture in Washington, D.C.
Industrial buildings and structures on the National Register of Historic Places in Washington, D.C.
Industrial buildings completed in 1877
Industrial buildings completed in 1911
Industrial buildings completed in 1936
Former laundry buildings
Individually listed contributing properties to historic districts on the National Register in Washington, D.C.